Don't Forget My Little Traudel is an East German comedy film, directed by Kurt Maetzig. It was released in 1957.

Plot
Traudel is a war orphan, whose mother had died in the Ravensbrück concentration camp after refusing to renounce her love for a Czechoslovak prisoner. The only remnant the daughter has from her mother is a letter ending with the words "don't forget me, my little Traudel". When she turns seventeen, she flees the orphanage and ventures to Berlin, where she meets policeman Hannes, who falls in love with her and even forges documents for her. He is caught, but is only slightly reprimanded, and marries her.

Cast

Production
At the late 1950s, the East German cultural establishment allowed a certain liberalization in the national cinema industry, and a series of entertainment-oriented films was produced by DEFA as a result, mainly comedies. Director Kurt Maetzig told an interviewer that he decided to create a light-hearted comedy after being exhausted by the work on "the all-too-serious" Castles and Cottages. He encountered difficulties when he tried to have the script approved for filming by the DEFA Commission, which criticized it for lack of morality and overly-sexual content; only the influence of the director and of writer Kurt Barthel enabled it to be authorized. Maetzig was influenced by The Seven Year Itch when making Don't Forget My Little Traudel, and included a scene in which Eva-Maria Hagen's skirt fluttered in the wind in a manner reminiscent of Marilyn Monroe's famous appearance. The movie was the actress' debut on screen.

Reception
Although Traudel was a commercial success, Maetzig complained that most critics did not respond well to the film: Mikhail Romm told that the director "betrayed Socialist Realism" after watching it. The East German authorities continued to see it in negative light after its release.

Antonin and Miera Liehm called the film "a tale of cheap sentimentality". Joshua Feinstein wrote that "the director was certainly not above... depicting women in demeaning conventions... as a voluptuous ditz". Sabine Hake noted that the film, while presenting the adventures of a teenage girl, still used the conventions of class struggle and other communist motifs when depicting society.

References

External links
 
 Don't Forget My Little Traudel on cinema.de.

1957 films
East German films
1950s German-language films
Films set in Berlin
Films directed by Kurt Maetzig